The women's doubles competition at the 1993 Australian Open was held between 18 January and 31 January 1993 on outdoor hard courts at the National Tennis Centre at Flinders Park in Melbourne, Australia. Gigi Fernández and Natasha Zvereva won the title, defeating Pam Shriver and Elizabeth Smylie in the final.

Seeds

Draw

Finals

Top half

Section 1

Section 2

Bottom half

Section 3

Section 4

External links
 1993 Australian Open – Women's draws and results at the International Tennis Federation

Women's Doubles
Australian Open (tennis) by year – Women's doubles
1993 in Australian women's sport
1993 in women's tennis